Curling at the 2017 Asian Winter Games was held in Sapporo, Japan between 18–24 February at Sapporo Curling Stadium. A total of two events were contested: a men's and women's tournaments. Curling returns to the competition schedule after missing out at the last edition of the games in 2011.

A total of eleven teams from six countries (six men and five women) contested the curling competitions.

Schedule

Medalists

Medal table

Participating nations
A total of 52 athletes from 6 nations competed in curling at the 2017 Asian Winter Games:

References

External links
Official Results Book – Curling

 
2017 Asian Winter Games events
2017 in curling
2017